The 2002–03 FA Cup was the 122nd staging of the world's oldest cup competition, the FA Cup. The competition was won by Arsenal with a 1–0 victory in the final at the Millennium Stadium, Cardiff against Southampton, courtesy of a Robert Pires goal.

Calendar

First round proper

At this stage the 48 Second and Third Division clubs joined the 32 non-league clubs who came through the qualifying rounds.

The matches were scheduled to be played on the weekend of Saturday, 16 November 2002, with replays in the week commencing 25 November.

Second round proper
The matches were scheduled to be played on the weekend of Saturday, 7 December 2002, with replays in the week commencing 16 December.

Third round proper
This round was the first in which Division 1 and Premier League (top-flight) teams entered the competition. The matches were scheduled to be played on the weekend of Saturday, 4 January 2003, with replays in the week commencing 13 January.

Shrewsbury, who ended the season with relegation from the Football League, achieved the biggest upset of the round (if not the whole competition), with a surprise 2–1 win over an Everton side who were pushing for a place in Europe and featuring a 17-year-old striker called Wayne Rooney – one of the most promising young players in the game.

Fourth round proper
 Matches played weekend of 25 January 2003 
 Four replays played week commencing 3 February 2003

Fifth round proper
 Matches played weekend of 15 February 2003 
 One replay played 26 February 2003

Sixth round proper
Holders Arsenal moved closer to retaining the trophy by beating Chelsea 3–1 in a replay that followed a 2–2 draw. They were paired in the semi-finals with Sheffield United, while the other semi-final would be contested between Southampton and Watford.

Replay

Semi-finals
For the 11th season running, the FA Cup final would be contested by top division clubs – Arsenal and Southampton. Their semi-final opponents (Sheffield United and Watford respectively) were both Division One sides.

Final

The final took place on Saturday, 17 May 2003 at the Millennium Stadium in Cardiff and ended 1–0 with a goal by Robert Pires separating the sides.

It was the third consecutive year the final was played at the Millennium Stadium, due to the ongoing reconstruction of Wembley Stadium, the final's usual venue. There were 73,726 spectators at the game. Arsenal retained the trophy, winning it for the ninth time in their history – a record second only to that of Manchester United.

It was also Southampton's first FA Cup final since 1976, when they won the trophy for the only time to date.

Notes

References

External links
2002/03 Results on www.thefa.com
Results on Soccerbase

 
FA Cup seasons
Fa Cup, 2002-03
FA